Rueland Frueauf the Younger (c. 1470 – after 1545) was a German Late-Gothic painter.

Biography
Frueauf was born in Salzburg, and later moved to Passau where he lived and worked for the rest his life. He produced primarily paintings, altarpieces, and frescoes for local churches. His father Rueland Frueauf the Elder was also a painter.

Frueauf the Younger died in Passau.

References

15th-century German painters
German male painters
16th-century German painters
1545 deaths
1470 births
Gothic painters